Earl Silas Johnson IV (February 7, 1934 – April 17, 2003), known as Earl King, was an American singer, guitarist, and songwriter, most active in blues music. A composer of blues standards such as "Come On" (covered by Jimi Hendrix, Freddie King, Stevie Ray Vaughan) and "Big Chief" (recorded by Professor Longhair), he was an important figure in New Orleans R&B.

Biography
King was born in New Orleans, Louisiana, United States. His father was a piano player. He died when Earl was still a baby, and Earl was brought up by his mother. With his mother, he started going to church at an early age. In his youth he sang gospel music, but he took the advice of a friend to switch to blues to make a better living.

King started to play the guitar at the age of 15. Soon he started entering talent contests at local clubs, including the Dew Drop Inn. At one such club he met his idol, Guitar Slim. King started imitating Slim, and his presence had a big impact on his musical direction. In 1954, Slim was injured in an automobile accident (right around the time he had the number 1 R&B hit "The Things That I Used To Do"), and King was deputized to continue a tour with Slim's band, representing himself as Slim. After succeeding in this role, King became a regular at the Dew Drop Inn.

His first recording was made in 1953. As Earl Johnson, he released a 78-rpm record, "Have You Gone Crazy"/"Begging at Your Mercy", for Savoy Records. The following year, the talent scout Johnny Vincent introduced King to Specialty Records, for which he recorded some sides, including "Mother's Love", which was locally popular. In 1955, King signed with Vincent's label, Ace. His first single for that label, "Those Lonely, Lonely Nights", was a hit, reaching number 7 on the Billboard R&B chart. He continued to record for Ace for the next five years. During that time, he also he started writing songs for other artists, such as Roland Stone and Jimmy Clanton.

In 1960, Dave Bartholomew invited King to record for Imperial Records. In sessions for that label, he was backed by a host of musicians, including Bob French, George French, James Booker, and Wardell Quezergue. It was at this label he recorded his signature songs "Come On" and "Trick Bag". The former has been a much-covered standard for decades, notably recorded by Jimi Hendrix, Stevie Ray Vaughan and Anson Funderburgh. The latter has also been widely covered, with versions by Johnny Winter, the Meters and Robert Palmer.  King co-wrote a number of songs with Bartholomew, either under his own name or under the pseudonym "E.C. King".

King recorded for Imperial until 1963. He went without a recording contract for the rest of the 1960s. During this time, he mostly concentrated on producing and songwriting for the local labels NOLA and Watch. His compositions from this era include "Big Chief", recorded by Professor Longhair; "Teasin' You", recorded by Willie Tee; and "Do-Re-Mi", recorded by Lee Dorsey. He went to Detroit for an audition with Motown Records and recorded a few tracks in the mid-1960s. Three tracks from that session are included on the album Motown's Blue Evolution, released in 1996.

In 1972, he was joined by Allen Toussaint and the Meters to record the album Street Parade. Atlantic Records initially showed interest in releasing it but eventually declined. The title track was released as a single on the Kansu label at the time, but the rest was unreleased until 1982, when the album was issued by Charly Records in the UK.

In the 1970s, he recorded another album, That Good Old New New Orleans Rock 'n Roll, which was released by Sonet in 1977. He also appeared on the album New Orleans Jazz & Heritage Festival 1976.

In the early 1980s, King met Hammond Scott, the co-owner of Black Top Records, and started to record for the label. The first album Glazed, on which he was backed by Roomful of Blues, was released in 1986. This particular album was nominated for a Grammy Award. A second album, Sexual Telepathy, released in 1990, featured Snooks Eaglin on two tracks and backing by Ronnie Earl & The Broadcasters on some tracks. He recorded his third album for Black Top, Hard River to Cross (1993), with backing by George Porter Jr., David Torkanowsky, and Herman V. Ernest III.

In 2001, King was hospitalized for an illness during a tour of New Zealand, but that did not stop him from performing. In December of the same year, he toured Japan. and he continued to perform off and on locally in New Orleans until his death.

King died on April 17, 2003, from diabetes-related complications, just a week before the New Orleans Jazz & Heritage Festival. His funeral was held on April 30, during the festival, and many musicians attended it, including Dr. John, Leo Nocentelli and Aaron Neville. His Imperial recordings, which had long been out of print, were reissued on CD soon after he died. The June 2003 issue of OffBeat, a local music magazine, paid tribute to King with a series of articles on him.

Discography

Albums
 1977: That Good Old New New Orleans Rock 'n Roll (Sonet)
 1982: Street Parade (Charly, recorded in 1972)
 1986: Glazed (Black Top) with Roomful of Blues
 1990: Sexual Telepathy (Black Top)
 1993: Hard River to Cross (Black Top)

Compilation albums
 1982:  Trick Bag (Imperial/Pathe Marconi) Imperial
 1997: Earl's Pearls: The Very Best of Earl King 1955–1960 (Westside) Ace
 2003: Come On: The Complete Imperial Recordings (Okra-Tone) Imperial
 2005: New Orleans Blues (Tomato) recorded for Atlantic in 1972, unreleased
 2006: The Chronological Earl King 1953–1955 (Classics) Savoy, Specialty, Ace
 2016: Come On: 40 Original Rhythm & Blues Classics (Not Now Music)
 2019: More Than Gold -The Complete 1955-1962 Ace & Imperial Singles- (Soul Jam)

References

External links
 Live concert recording of the Radiators with King, from the Internet Archive
 Cascade Blues: Earl King by Greg Johnson
 Earl King Story by Larry Benicewicz
 Earl King Discography 

1934 births
2003 deaths
African-American guitarists
American blues guitarists
American male guitarists
American blues singer-songwriters
Rhythm and blues musicians from New Orleans
Imperial Records artists
Ace Records (United States) artists
Black Top Records artists
Savoy Records artists
Charly Records artists
Specialty Records artists
Deaths from diabetes
Blues musicians from New Orleans
20th-century American guitarists
Singer-songwriters from Louisiana
Guitarists from Louisiana
American rhythm and blues singers
American rhythm and blues guitarists
African-American male singer-songwriters
20th-century African-American male singers